Brelan is a famous French vying game with rapidly escalating bets from the seventeenth to nineteenth century, and hence also a name for a card player, gambler or the name of the place where the game was played. The game is quite similar to the game of Bouillotte, but it is not played anymore.

History
In Old French, a brelan, berlan or berlenc (from High German: bretling = "board, table") was a table on which people played dice. The game of Brelan, even , for the name and the rules varied over time, appeared as early as an edict of Lille, France, of 1458. In Crébillon's 1763 novel "Le Hasard du coin du feu", the game of "Brelan" takes centre stage. It is often considered as sharing roots with a Renaissance game of Primero and Primo visto. The game is recorded as Treschaken in a Holstein dialect dictionary in 1802 where it is equated to the French bréland.

In England, Brelan eventually developed into the game of Brag, also Bragg, where the possibility of bluffing is an important part of the game. It evidently derived from the game of Brelan and later evolved into Bouillotte, which flourished during the French Revolution. Most experts believe that all these earlier card games played an important part in the formation of modern Poker, the most famous representative of a very ancient and always very popular family of games, all of which can be traced even further back to the old French game of Gilet (Gillet, Gile  or Trionfetti), which may be considered the most ancient European ancestor of Poker.

The game
Brelan is played by three, four or five players, with a 32-card pack, each receiving 3 cards and a fourth turned from the stock. The best hand is a brelan carre, or four of a kind, made with the aid of the turn-up card on the table, followed by a simple brelan or prial. Brelan favori is a pair royal composed of 2 cards in the hand and the card turned.

In Brelan Cavé, the game is limited to a certain number of rounds, the bouillotte, on the contrary, lasts as long as there are players in the game who still have not lost their stakes.

See also
Primero
Brag
Bouillotte
Post and Pair
Put (card game)
Ambigu
Gilet

References

Literature 
 Cauquetoux, Anne (2007). Cache-cache et chat perché: les mots du jeu. Le Robert.
 Schütze, Johann Friedrich (1806). Holsteinisches Idiotikon, Part 4, Hammerich, Hamburg-Altona.

Le Brelan at the Academy of Lost Games (Académie des jeux Oubliés) website.

15th-century card games
Comparing card games
Gambling games
French card games
Vying games